Desa Cattle Dairy Farm is a dairy farm located at the foot of Mount Kinabalu in Kundasang Valley, Sabah, Malaysia owned by the Desa Cattle (Sabah) Sdn Bhd where most of Sabah's cow milk and dairy product been produced. The farm covering an area of 199-hectare and has been frequently dubbed as Sabah's "Little New Zealand" with geographic panorama scenery view almost looked like in the latter country; as well with its cow breed of Holstein Friesian which is imported from the country.

References 

Dairy farming in Malaysia
Tourist attractions in Sabah